Kjell Dennis Collander (born 9 May 2002) is a Swedish football midfielder who plays for Hammarby IF in Allsvenskan.

Early life
Collander was born in Västerås and started to play football as a youngster with local club Barkarö SK. At age 11, he moved to Skiljebo SK.

Club career

Skiljebo SK
On 14 February 2018, aged 15, Collander was promoted to Skiljebo's senior team, competing in Division 2, Sweden's fourth tier. He played 12 league games throughout the season, scoring once, helping the club to finish 2nd in the table.

Örebro SK
On 17 January 2019, Collander transferred to Örebro SK in Allsvenskan, the domestic top tier. He signed a three-year deal with the club, after a successful trial. He spent the most of the season sidelined, nursing an abdominal muscle injury.

On 5 July 2020, Collander made his debut for Örebro in Allsvenskan, in a 1–2 loss to IK Sirius, coming on as a late substitute. He ended the 2020 season making 15 league appearances for Örebro, that finished 7th in the Allsvenskan table.

On 10 February 2021, Collander signed a new three-year deal with Örebro. He made 21 league appearances, scoring twice, before his season was cut short in early October due to a knee injury. Collander was unable to save the club from suffering a relegation to Superettan, but was voted Örebro Player of the Year by the fans of the club.

Hammarby IF
On 12 January 2022, Collander transferred to Hammarby IF in Allsvenskan, signing a four and a half-year contract until the summer of 2026. The transfer fee was reportedly set at around 4,5 million SEK. Collander featured in the final of the 2021–22 Svenska Cupen, in which Hammarby lost by 4–5 on penalties to Malmö FF after the game ended in a 0–0 draw. On 22 July 2022, it was announced that Collander would be sidelined for several months due to an other knee injury.

International career
Between 2017 and 2019, Collander won 22 caps for the Swedish national under-17 team, scoring twice. He briefly captained the side and was called up to the 2019 UEFA European Under-17 Championship, where Sweden was eliminated in the group stage.

On 3 June 2021, Collander made his debut for the Swedish national under–21 team, in a 2–0 win against Finland.

Personal life
His father Conny Collander is a former footballer who represented Västerås SK between 1989 and 1996, mainly in the Swedish second tier, before he was forced to retire due to several knee injuries.

Career statistics

Club

Honours

Individual
 Örebro SK Player of the Year: 2021

References

2002 births
Living people
Swedish footballers
Association football midfielders
Örebro SK players
Hammarby Fotboll players
Hammarby Talang FF players
Allsvenskan players
Ettan Fotboll players
Division 2 (Swedish football) players
Sweden youth international footballers
Sportspeople from Västerås